Thomas Laspeyre (c. 1834–1883) was an American miner, politician and lawyer. He emigrated from North Carolina to California in 1853, making him an American pioneer, and he took up mining in San Joaquin County, California. He was a member of the California State Assembly from 1859 to 1862, where he held pro-Southern sentiment. After practicing the law in California and Nevada, he became the city attorney of Butte, Montana in the early 1880s.

Early life
Thomas Laspeyre was born in North Carolina circa 1834. He had two sisters. He moved to California in 1853, making him an American pioneer.

Career
Laspeyre became a miner in California.

Laspeyre served as a member of the California State Assembly for San Joaquin County from 1859 to 1862. In 1861, he voted against a state resolution for California to stay in the Union (which passed the assembly).

By 1866, Laspeyre became a lawyer in Havilah, California. He later practiced law in Eureka, Nevada.

Laspeyre moved to Butte, Montana in 1881, and he was subsequently elected as the city attorney. He was an Odd Fellow.

Death
Laspeyre died in 1883 from pneumonia.  He never married and had no children.

References

1830s births
1883 deaths
People from North Carolina
People from San Joaquin County, California
People from Butte, Montana
California pioneers
American miners
Members of the California State Assembly
19th-century American politicians
People in 19th-century California
19th-century American lawyers
California lawyers
Nevada lawyers
Montana city attorneys
People from Kern County, California
People from Eureka, Nevada
Deaths from pneumonia in Montana